The 2021 Buffalo Bulls football team represented the University at Buffalo in the 2021 NCAA Division I FBS football season. The Bulls were led by first-year coach Maurice Linguist and played their home games at the University at Buffalo Stadium as members of the East Division of the Mid-American Conference.

Previous season
In a limited season, which was initially canceled due to the COVID-19 pandemic before being reinstated, the Bulls finished the 2020 season 6–1, 5–0 in MAC play to win the East Division. They lost to Ball State in the MAC Championship. They received an invite to the Camelia Bowl where they defeated Marshall.

Following the season head coach Lance Leipold left the team to take the head coach position at Kansas. A few days later, the school named Michigan co-defensive coordinator Maurice Linguist the team's new head coach.

2021 NFL draft 
Defensive end Malcolm Koonce was selected in the third round of the NFL draft by the Las Vegas Raiders. Koonce was the 15th Buffalo player to be drafted in the program’s history, and the first since 2017, when the Cincinnati Bengals selected Bulls tight end Mason Schreck in the seventh round, at No. 251. Koonce became the third Buffalo player drafted by the Raiders, joining Trevor Scott in 2008 and Khalil Mack in 2014.

Schedule

Source

References

Buffalo
Buffalo Bulls football seasons
Buffalo Bulls football